The 2021 Liverpool City Council election took place on 6 May 2021 to elect members of Liverpool City Council, alongside other elections across the United Kingdom. One third of the council were up for election, as well as the Mayor of Liverpool, the Metro Mayor of Liverpool City Region and Police and Crime Commissioner Merseyside Police, all covering Liverpool.

Council composition
Before the election the composition of the council was:

After the election the composition of the council was:

Retiring councillors

Results summary

Results

Allerton and Hunts Cross

Anfield

Belle Vale

Central

Childwall

Church

Clubmoor

County

Cressington

Croxteth

Everton

Fazakerley

Greenbank

Kensington and Fairfield

Kirkdale

Knotty Ash

Mossley Hill

Norris Green

Old Swan

Picton

Princes Park

Riverside

Speke–Garston

St. Michaels

Tuebrook and Stoneycroft

Warbreck

Wavertree

West Derby

Woolton

Yew Tree

By Elections

Anfield 18th November 2021
Caused by the death of Councillor Ros Groves.

Clubmoor 18th November 2021

Caused by the death of Cllr. Tim Jeeves.

Kirkdale 18th November 2021

Caused by the resignation of Malcolm Kennedy, who had been living in Spain for the previous 18 months.

Everton 7th April 2022

Caused by the resignation of Councillor Ian Byrne MP, who had been elected as an MP in the December 2019 General Election.

Warbreck 7th April 2022

Caused by the resignation of Councillor Cheryl Didsbury.

Fazakerley 30th June 2022

Caused by the resignation of Councillor Lyndsay Melia on 30th March 2022.

See also

 Liverpool City Council
 Liverpool Town Council elections 1835 - 1879
 Liverpool City Council elections 1880–present
 Mayors and Lord Mayors of Liverpool 1207 to present
 History of local government in England
 Elections in the United Kingdom

References

Liverpool City Region mayoral election
Elections in Merseyside
2020s in Liverpool